The prime minister of the United Kingdom is the head of government of the United Kingdom. The prime minister advises the sovereign on the exercise of much of the royal prerogative, chairs the Cabinet and selects its ministers. As modern prime ministers hold office by virtue of their ability to command the confidence of the House of Commons, they sit as members of Parliament.

The office of prime minister is not established by any statute or constitutional document, but exists only by long-established convention, whereby the reigning monarch appoints as prime minister the person most likely to command the confidence of the House of Commons; this individual is typically the leader of the political party or coalition of parties that holds the largest number of seats in that chamber.

The prime minister is ex officio also First Lord of the Treasury, Minister for the Civil Service and the minister responsible for national security. Indeed, certain privileges, such as residency of 10 Downing Street, are accorded to prime ministers by virtue of their position as First Lord of the Treasury. In 2019, the office of Minister for the Union was established; Boris Johnson became the first prime minister to hold this title.

Rishi Sunak has been the incumbent prime minister since 25 October 2022.

History

The position of prime minister was not created; it evolved slowly and organically over three hundred years due to numerous Acts of Parliament, political developments, and accidents of history. The office is therefore best understood from a historical perspective. The origins of the position are found in constitutional changes that occurred during the Revolutionary Settlement (1688–1720) and the resulting shift of political power from the sovereign to Parliament. Although the sovereign was not stripped of their ancient prerogative powers and legally remained the head of government, politically it gradually became necessary for him or her to govern through a prime minister who could command a majority in Parliament.

By the 1830s, the Westminster system of government (or cabinet government) had emerged; the prime minister had become primus inter pares or the first among equals in the Cabinet and the head of government in the United Kingdom. The political position of prime minister was enhanced by the development of modern political parties, the introduction of mass communication and photography. By the start of the 20th century the modern premiership had emerged; the office had become the pre-eminent position in the constitutional hierarchy in relation to the sovereign, Parliament and Cabinet.

Before 1902, the prime minister sometimes sat in the House of Lords, provided that his government could form a majority in the Commons. However, as the power of the aristocracy waned during the 19th century the convention developed that the prime minister should always sit as a Member of Parliament in the lower house, making them answerable only to the Commons in Parliament. The prime minister's authority was further enhanced by the Parliament Act 1911, which marginalised the influence of the House of Lords in the law-making process.

Authority, powers and constraints

The prime minister is the head of the United Kingdom government. As such, the modern prime minister leads the Cabinet (the Executive). In addition, the prime minister leads a major political party and generally commands a majority in the House of Commons (the lower chamber of Parliament). The incumbent wields both significant legislative and executive powers. Under the British system, there is a unity of powers rather than separation.

In the House of Commons, the prime minister guides the law-making process with the goal of enacting the legislative agenda of their political party. In an executive capacity, the prime minister appoints (and may dismiss) all other Cabinet members and ministers, and co-ordinates the policies and activities of all government departments, and the staff of the Civil Service. The prime minister also acts as the public "face" and "voice" of His Majesty's Government, both at home and abroad. Solely upon the advice of the prime minister, the sovereign exercises many statutory and prerogative powers, including high judicial, political, official and Church of England ecclesiastical appointments; the conferral of peerages and some knighthoods, decorations and other important honours.

Constitutional background

The British system of government is based on an uncodified constitution, meaning that it is not set out in any single document. The British constitution consists of many documents and most importantly for the evolution of the office of the prime minister, it is based on customs known as constitutional conventions that became accepted practice. In 1928, Prime Minister H. H. Asquith described this characteristic of the British constitution in his memoirs:In this country we live ... under an unwritten Constitution. It is true that we have on the Statute-book great instruments like Magna Carta, the Petition of Right, and the Bill of Rights which define and secure many of our rights and privileges; but the great bulk of our constitutional liberties and ... our constitutional practices do not derive their validity and sanction from any Bill which has received the formal assent of the King, Lords and Commons. They rest on usage, custom, convention, often of slow growth in their early stages, not always uniform, but which in the course of time received universal observance and respect.

The relationships between the prime minister and the sovereign, Parliament and Cabinet are defined largely by these unwritten conventions of the constitution. Many of the prime minister's executive and legislative powers are actually royal prerogatives which are still formally vested in the sovereign, who remains the head of state. Despite its growing dominance in the constitutional hierarchy, the premiership was given little formal recognition until the 20th century; the legal fiction was maintained that the sovereign still governed directly. The position was first mentioned in statute only in 1917, in the schedule of the Chequers Estate Act. Increasingly during the 20th century, the office and role of prime minister featured in statute law and official documents; however, the prime minister's powers and relationships with other institutions still largely continue to derive from ancient royal prerogatives and historic and modern constitutional conventions. Prime ministers continue to hold the position of First Lord of the Treasury and, since November 1968, that of Minister for the Civil Service, the latter giving them authority over the civil service.

Under this arrangement, Britain might appear to have two executives: the prime minister and the sovereign. The concept of "the Crown" resolves this paradox. The Crown symbolises the state's authority to govern: to make laws and execute them, impose taxes and collect them, declare war and make peace. Before the "Glorious Revolution" of 1688, the sovereign exclusively wielded the powers of the Crown; afterwards, Parliament gradually forced monarchs to assume a neutral political position. Parliament has effectively dispersed the powers of the Crown, entrusting its authority to responsible ministers (the prime minister and Cabinet), accountable for their policies and actions to Parliament, in particular the elected House of Commons.

Although many of the sovereign's prerogative powers are still legally intact, constitutional conventions have removed the monarch from day-to-day governance, with ministers exercising the royal prerogatives, leaving the monarch in practice with three constitutional rights: to be kept informed, to advise and to warn.

Modern premiership

Appointment
In modern times, much of the process involving prime ministerial appointments is informally governed by constitutional conventions and authoritative sources, like The Cabinet Manual, paragraphs 2.7 to 2.20 and 3.1 to 3.2.

The prime minister is appointed by the monarch, through the exercise of the royal prerogative. In the past, the monarch has used personal choice to dismiss or appoint a prime minister (the last time being in 1834), but it is now the case that they should not be drawn into party politics.

The prime minister "...holds that position by virtue of his or her ability to command the confidence of the House of Commons, which in turn commands the confidence of the electorate, as expressed through a general election." By convention, the prime minister is also an MP and is normally the leader of the political party that commands a majority in the House of Commons.

Prime Minister's Office

The Prime Minister's Office helps the prime minister to 'establish and deliver the government's overall strategy and policy priorities, and to communicate the government's policies to Parliament, the public and international audiences'. The Prime Minister's Office is formally part of the Cabinet Office, but the boundary between its work and that of the wider Cabinet Office can be unclear; the wider Cabinet Office might carry out very similar work. Peter Hennessy has claimed that this overall arrangement means there is in fact effectively a Prime Minister's Department, though it is not called this.

Prime Minister's Questions

Prime Minister's Questions is a constitutional convention, currently held as a single session every Wednesday at noon when the House of Commons is sitting, in which the prime minister answers questions from members of Parliament (MPs). The leader of the opposition usually asks the prime minister six questions, and the leader of the third-largest parliamentary party can ask two questions. It is an occasion when the prime minister appears regularly on live television and radio.

The prime minister also appears before the Liaison Committee to answer questions about public policy.

Security and transport

The personal protection of the prime minister and former prime ministers is the responsibility of Protection Command within the Metropolitan Police Service. The fleet of Prime Ministerial Cars provides the prime minister with a number of security features as well as transport. The vehicles are driven by officers from this unit. Air transport for the prime minister is provided by a variety of military and civilian operators.

International role

One of the roles of the prime minister is to represent the UK at home and abroad, for example at the annual G7 Summit. The prime minister makes many international trips. According to Gus O'Donnell, the number of overseas visits for the prime minister has gone up.

Deputy 

The prime minister's second-in-command has variably served as deputy prime minister, first secretary of state and de facto deputy and at other times prime ministers have chosen not to select a permanent deputy at all, preferring ad hoc arrangements.

Succession 
Nobody has the right of automatic succession to the prime ministership. However, it is generally considered by those with an interest in the matter that in the event of the death of the prime minister, it would be appropriate to appoint an interim prime minister, though there is some debate as to how to decide who this should be.

According to Rodney Brazier, there are no procedures within government to cope with the sudden death of the prime minister. There is also no such title as acting prime minister of the United Kingdom. Despite refusing "...to discuss a hypothetical situation" with BBC News in 2011, the Cabinet Office said the following in 2006:Additionally, when the prime minister is travelling, it is standard practice for a senior duty minister to be appointed who can attend to urgent business and meetings if required, though the prime minister remains in charge and updated throughout.

On 6 April 2020, when Prime Minister Boris Johnson was admitted into ICU, he asked First Secretary of State Dominic Raab "to deputise for him where necessary".

Resignation

A prime minister ends their tenure by offering their resignation to the British monarch. This can happen after their party has suffered a general election defeat, so that they no longer command the confidence of the House of Commons. It can also happen mid-term, if they are forced to resign for political reasons, or for other reasons such as ill-health. If the prime minister resigns mid-term, and their party has a majority in the Commons, the party selects a new leader according to its rules, and this new leader is invited by the monarch to become the new prime minister. The outgoing prime minister is likely to remain in post until the new leader has been chosen by the party. After resigning, the outgoing prime minister remains a Member of Parliament. An outgoing prime minister can ask the monarch to bestow honours on any number of people of their choosing, known as the Prime Minister's Resignation Honours. No incumbent prime minister has ever lost their own seat at a general election. Only one prime minister has been assassinated: Spencer Perceval, in 1812.

Precedence, privileges and form of address

On taking office a new prime minister usually makes a public statement to announce to the country that they have been appointed by the reigning monarch (called "kissing hands"). This is usually done by saying words to the effect of:

Throughout the United Kingdom, the prime minister outranks all other dignitaries except members of the royal family, the lord chancellor, and senior ecclesiastical figures.

In 2010, the prime minister received £142,500 including a salary of £65,737 as a member of parliament. Until 2006, the lord chancellor was the highest-paid member of the government, ahead of the prime minister. This reflected the lord chancellor's position at the head of the judicial pay scale. The Constitutional Reform Act 2005 eliminated the lord chancellor's judicial functions and also reduced the office's salary to below that of the prime minister.

The prime minister is customarily a member of the Privy Council and thus entitled to the appellation "The Right Honourable". Membership of the council is retained for life. It is a constitutional convention that only a privy counsellor can be appointed prime minister. Most potential candidates have already attained this status. The only case when a non-privy counsellor was the natural appointment was Ramsay MacDonald in 1924. The issue was resolved by appointing him to the Council immediately prior to his appointment as prime minister.

According to the now-defunct Department for Constitutional Affairs, the prime minister is made a privy counsellor as a result of taking office and should be addressed by the official title prefixed by "The Right Honourable" and not by a personal name. Although this form of address is employed on formal occasions, it is rarely used by the media. As "prime minister" is a position, not a title, the incumbent should be referred to as "the prime minister". The title "Prime Minister" (e.g. "Prime Minister Rishi Sunak") is technically incorrect but is sometimes used erroneously outside the United Kingdom and has more recently become acceptable within it. Within the UK, the expression "Prime Minister Sunak" is never used, although it, too, is sometimes used by foreign dignitaries and news sources.

10 Downing Street, in London, has been the official place of residence of the prime minister since 1732; they are entitled to use its staff and facilities, including extensive offices. Chequers, a country house in Buckinghamshire, gifted to the government in 1917, may be used as a country retreat for the prime minister.

Retirement honours 
Upon retirement, it is customary for the sovereign to grant a prime minister some honour or dignity. The honour bestowed is commonly, but not invariably, membership of the UK's most senior order of chivalry, the Order of the Garter. The practice of creating a retired prime minister a Knight of the Garter (KG) has been fairly prevalent since the mid-nineteenth century. Upon the retirement of a prime minister who is Scottish, it is likely that the primarily Scottish honour of Knight of the Thistle (KT) will be used instead of the Order of the Garter, which is generally regarded as an English honour.

Historically it has also been common to grant prime ministers a peerage upon retirement from the Commons, elevating the individual to the Lords. Formerly, the peerage bestowed was usually an earldom. The last such creation was for Harold Macmillan, who resigned in 1963. Unusually, he became Earl of Stockton only in 1984, over twenty years after leaving office.

Macmillan's successors, Alec Douglas-Home, Harold Wilson, James Callaghan and Margaret Thatcher, all accepted life peerages (although Douglas-Home had previously disclaimed his hereditary title as Earl of Home). Edward Heath did not accept a peerage of any kind and nor have any of the prime ministers to retire since 1990, although Heath in 1992, John Major in 2005 and Tony Blair in 2022 were later appointed as Knights of the Garter, the latter had previously disclosed that he did not want honours bestowed for himself or future prime ministers.

The most recent former prime minister to die was Margaret Thatcher (1979–1990) on 8 April 2013. Her death meant that for the first time since 1955 (the year in which the Earldom of Attlee was created, subsequent to the death of Earl Baldwin in 1947) the membership of the House of Lords included no former prime minister, a situation which remains the case as of 2022.

Public Duty Costs Allowance (PDCA) 

All former prime ministers are entitled to claim for salary or office expenses incurred in fulfilling public duties in that role. The allowance may not be used to pay for private or parliamentary duties. It is administered by the Cabinet Office Finance Team.

The maximum amount which may be claimed per year is £115,000, plus 10% towards any staff pension costs. This limit is reviewed annually, and at the start of each Parliament, by the Prime Minister. The maximum level may be adjusted downwards if the former prime minister receives any public funds for fulfilling other  public appointments.

See also

Lists of prime ministers by different criteria

 Timeline of prime ministers of Great Britain and the United Kingdom
 List of prime ministers of the United Kingdom
 List of prime ministers of the United Kingdom by length of tenure
 List of prime ministers of the United Kingdom by age
 List of prime ministers of the United Kingdom by education
 List of current heads of government in the United Kingdom and dependencies
 List of fictional prime ministers of the United Kingdom
 List of peerages held by prime ministers of the United Kingdom
 List of United Kingdom Parliament constituencies represented by sitting prime ministers
 Historical rankings of prime ministers of the United Kingdom

All lists: :Category:Lists of prime ministers of the United Kingdom

Other related pages

 Air transport of the Royal Family and Government of the United Kingdom
 Spouse of the prime minister of the United Kingdom
 Records of prime ministers of the United Kingdom
 Deputy Prime Minister of the United Kingdom
 Cultural depictions of prime ministers of the United Kingdom 
 List of things named after prime ministers of the United Kingdom
 List of nicknames of prime ministers of the United Kingdom
 :Category:Books written by prime ministers of the United Kingdom
 Armorial of prime ministers of the United Kingdom
 List of burial places of prime ministers of the United Kingdom

More related pages: :Category:Prime Ministers of the United Kingdom

Notes

References

Works cited

Further reading

External links

 Number 10 official website
 Parliament of the United Kingdom website
 Principal Ministers of the Crown: 1730–2006

 
Ministerial offices in the United Kingdom
Political history of the United Kingdom
 
United Kingdom nuclear command and control